Get All You Deserve is the first live DVD and second live album by progressive rock musician Steven Wilson, released on 24 September 2012. It was filmed at a sold-out show in Mexico City, Mexico, during his Grace for Drowning tour. The deluxe edition of Get All You Deserve consists of two CDs, a DVD and a Blu-ray disc.

Track listing
All songs written and composed by Steven Wilson.

Personnel
Performers
Steven Wilson — vocals, guitar, mellotron, piano, other keyboards
Adam Holzman — keyboards
Marco Minnemann — drums
Nick Beggs — bass guitar, stick, backing vocals
Niko Tsonev — guitar
Theo Travis — saxophone, flute, clarinet, keyboards

Additional personnel
Lasse Hoile — director, editor, concert visuals, concert photography
Steven Wilson — sound remixing
Ian Bond — front of house sound
Paul van der Heijkant — concert lighting
Grant Wakefield — director of 'Litany' film
Joe del Tufo — concert photography
Diana Nitschke — concert photography
Susana Moyaho — additional photographs
Nancy Akl — additional photographs
Jasmine Walkes — additional photographs
Carl Glover (for Aleph) — design

References

2012 video albums
Steven Wilson albums
2012 live albums